Border Zone is an interactive fiction video game written by Marc Blank and  published by Infocom in 1987. It was released for DOS, Apple II, Commodore 64, Amiga, Atari ST, and Macintosh. Unlike most other purely text-based games, Border Zone incorporates real-time aspects of gameplay. It is also Infocom's thirtieth game. Its tagline is "Action and international intrigue behind the Iron Curtain."

Plot
Mirroring the real-world tension of the Cold War in the 1980s, Border Zone is set in and around Ostnitz, located on the border between the Eastern Bloc nation of Frobnia and neutral Litzenburg. The celebration of "Constitution Day" in Ostnitz will include a speech by Litzenburg's American ambassador; there is a plot in motion, however, to assassinate the ambassador in an effort to provoke hostilities between the superpowers. Border Zone consists of three chapters, each of which places the player in the role of a different character. An American businessman, a KGB agent, and an American spy become entangled in the assassination plot and efforts to either stop it or ensure its success.

The tension is increased by the introduction of real-time events in the game. Unusual for a text adventure, game time continues to pass even as the computer waits for the player's next input. Certain actions, such as sneaking past a guard post, must be timed carefully to succeed.

Feelies
Besides the high quality of their interactive fiction games, Infocom was also known for feelies: extra items included in each game package related to the story, and sometimes used as copy protection. The Border Zone feelies included:
I Am Frobnia, a "Fortunate Tourists Guide and Phrasebook"
A business card from "Riznik's Antiques, Rare Books and Curios" (In Historic Ostnitz for 35 Years)
A matchbook with the logo of the Frobnia National Railway (Frobniz Bourashni Rallni)
A map of the border between Frobnia and Litzenburg

Notes
The game's working title was Spy.

Around the time of Border Zone'''s release, Infocom stopped assigning difficulty ratings to its games. Players generally consider Border Zone to correspond to either Infocom's "Standard" or "Advanced" level of difficulty.Border Zone was the only game Infocom ever published in the "Espionage" genre.

Infocom's experiment with real-time interactive fiction was not entirely successful. Many players enjoyed what had previously been a hallmark of Infocom's games: the total irrelevance of "real-world" time. Formerly, if a player had to leave the computer to eat, go to school, run an errand, etc., the game would still be in the same state as before. Border Zone removed that certainty. Additionally, this was the first Infocom game in which a speedy typist could theoretically be more successful than a slower one.

ReceptionComputer Gaming Worlds Scorpia found Border Zones division into three standalone adventures unsatisfying, and stated that it would have been better as one. She concluded that it was "one of Infocom's weakest games to date". PC Magazine stated that the game "has hit upon exactly the right scenario for an interactive novel" and praised the feelies' "rich detail".Compute!'' also praised the feelies, and stated that the real-time game play and playing three different characters distinguished the game from other text adventures.

References

External links
 
 
 Border Zone information and overview
 Scans of Border Zone packaging, documentation and feelies
 The Infocom Bugs List entry for Border Zone
 

1980s interactive fiction
1987 video games
Adventure games
Amiga games
Apple II games
Atari ST games
Commodore 64 games
DOS games
Infocom games
Classic Mac OS games
Spy video games
Video games developed in the United States
Video games set in Eastern Europe